Rhinerrhizopsis, commonly known as freckle orchids, is a genus of three species from the orchid family, Orchidaceae. Plants in this genus are epiphytes with smooth, thin roots, fleshy or leathery leaves and a large number of small, round, short-lived flowers with a three-lobed labellum. These orchids are found in the Bismarck Archipelago, the Solomon Islands, New Guinea and tropical North Queensland, Australia.

Description
Orchids in the genus Rhinerrhizopsis are epiphytic herbs with a short stem with smooth, thin roots at the base and fleshy or leathery leaves folded lengthwise. There are many relatively small, round, resupinate, short-lived flowers arranged on a long, thin flowering stem. The flowers are fragrant and have sepals and petals that are yellowish with reddish brown spots. The labellum is cream-coloured with reddish, brownish or orange markings.

Taxonomy and naming
The genus Rhinerrhizopsis was first formally described in 2000 by Paul Ormerod. The description was published in a supplement of Oasis, the journal. The type species is Rhinerrhizopsis moorei. The name Rhinerrhizopsis refers to the similarity of plants in this genus to those in the genus Rhinerrhiza. The ending -opsis is an Ancient Greek suffix meaning "having the appearance of" or "like".

Species list:
The following species are accepted by the World Checklist of Selected Plant Families as of December 2018:

 Rhinerrhizopsis matutina D.L.Jones & M.A.Clem.
 Rhinerrhizopsis moorei (Rchb.f.) Ormerod
 Rhinerrhizopsis ramuana (Kraenzl.) D.L.Jones & M.A.Clem.

Distribution and habitat
Orchids in the genus Rhinerrhizopsis grow on trees and shrubs in rainforest and humid open forest and are found in the Bismarck Archipelago, the Solomon Islands, New Guinea and tropical North Queensland, Australia.

See also
 List of Orchidaceae genera

References

External links

Aeridinae
Vandeae genera